The 1999–2000 Umaglesi Liga was the eleventh season of top-tier football in Georgia. It began on 12 August 1999 and ended on 30 May 2000. Dinamo Tbilisi were the defending champions.

Locations

First stage

Group A

Results

Group B

Results

Second stage

Championship playoff

Results

Relegation playoff

Results

Top goalscorers

See also 

1999–2000 Georgian Cup

References
Georgia - List of final tables (RSSSF)

Erovnuli Liga seasons
1
Georgia